Kyrgyzstan competed at the 2020 Winter Youth Olympics in Lausanne, Switzerland from 9 to 22 January 2020.

Biathlon

Girls

Cross-country skiing 

Boys

Girls

See also
Kyrgyzstan at the 2020 Summer Olympics

References

2020 in Kyrgyzstani sport
Nations at the 2020 Winter Youth Olympics
Kyrgyzstan at the Youth Olympics